Sanzeno is a comune (municipality) in Trentino in the northern Italian region Trentino-Alto Adige/Südtirol, located about  north of Trento.

Geography
The municipality of Sanzeno contains the frazioni (subdivisions, mainly villages and hamlets) of Banco, Casez and Piano.

Sanzeno borders the following municipalities: Cles, Coredo, Dambel, Revò, Romallo, Romeno, Taio and Tassullo.

Gallery

See also 

 São Romédio Community

Demographic evolution

References

External links

Homepage of the city

Cities and towns in Trentino-Alto Adige/Südtirol